Bank Refah Kargaran, also known as Bank Refah (in , Bank Refah), is one of Iran's major banks. Bank Refah, with its headquarters in Tehran, Iran, is a retail commercial bank owned and controlled by Social Security Organization of Iran. Bank Refah provides a full range of products and services to more than a million clients. Its SWIFT address is REFAIRTH.

History

The workers' bank
Bank Refah was established in 1960 to provide basic banking services to the Iranian workers. Those services included collection of insurance premiums, payment of salaries and pensions, mortgages and personal loans. Bank Refah was categorized as a non-commercial bank until it was nationalized in 1979 less than a year after the Islamic Revolution. With the Nationalization law passed by the Islamic Majlis of Iran, the bank's ownership was transferred to the government. It was also recategorized as a commercial bank.

Ownership
In accordance with article 39 of Iran's 1959 fiscal budget, Bank Refah's initial capital was 400,000,000 Iranian Rials (just over US$5.7 million) fully funded by the Iranian Social Security Organization. Although the bank was nationalized in 1979, its management was returned to the Social Welfare Organization (now known as the Ministry of Welfare and Social Affairs) in 1993. In March 2001, the bank's capital was raised to Rls 1,961 Billion (approximately US$250M) of which close to 94 percent was paid by the Iranian Social Security Organization. The bank currently owns a subsidiary in Belarus, known as Onerbank

Sanctions
On 6 September 2013, the European General Court in Luxembourg ruled to annul the European Union sanctions in place since 2010 against the bank on grounds of supporting the Iranian nuclear and missile programs, as the EU had failed to explain the reasons for the sanctions. > As of 2016, the EU asset freeze was still in effect.

Islamic banking

All banks in Iran must follow the banking principles and practices described in the Islamic banking law of Iran passed in 1983 by the Islamic Majlis of Iran. According to this law, banks can only engage in interest-free Islamic transactions (interest is considered as usury or riba and is forbidden by Islam and the holy book of Quran). These are commercial transactions that involve exchange of goods and services in return for a share of the assumed "profit". All such transactions are performed through Islamic contracts, such as Mozarebe, Foroush Aghsati, Joale, Salaf, and Gharzol-hassane. Details of these contracts and related practices are outlined in the Iranian Interest-Free banking law and its guidelines.

In July 2007 the bank launched a new banking service named "Gold Coins Deposit Account". Through this new service, Bank Refah's customers can deposit their gold coins into a special deposit account and in return receive points, which they can then redeem against future loans and credits. The launch of this unique deposit account, which received high publicity in the Iranian media, was marked by a presidential speech by the Iranian president Mahmoud Ahmadinejad.

The bank's CEO Peyman Nouri announced in March 2007 that his bank has been authorized by the Central Bank of Iran to issue international credit cards.

Financial numbers
 June 16, 2010 ($1 UD is approximately 10,400 [Iranian Rial](Rls) ):
Total assets = Rls 41,453 billion
Capitalization = Rls 895 billion
Total income = Rls 1,614 billion
Total loans = Rls 29,441 billion
Total deposits (short and long term) = Rls 25,719 billion
Number of branches = 1128
Number of employees  = 9570
Market share = 6.8% of total deposits and 5% of total loans

Current CEO and directors
  Dr.Esmaeel Lalegani , CEO
  Farshid Farokhnejad
  Nejat Amini
  Ali Sarzaeim
  Hamidreza Fathi Beiranvand

Previous CEOs
 Mohammad Ali Sahmani 
 Ali Sedghi
 Jafar Safaei Mazid
 Esmaeel lalehgani
 MohammadJavad MohagheghNia
 Farshid FarokhNegad

Significant buildings
Valiasr Building — 2584 Valiasr Ave, Tehran
Pardis Building — 40 Shiraz Shomali, Tehran

Payment Received controversial CEO 
In June 2016 CEO of the bank's earnings news release (Ali Sidqi) by a news site about the rights and benefits administrators led to frequent controversy and debate.

Information technology
Bank Refah established its first Data Processing department in early 1970s. The Data Processing department was equipped with a small IBM 370 Mainframe computer, which was mainly used for batch processing of deposit and mortgage accounts. The bank's IT department was later dissolved in 1976 and its staff were moved to the IT division of the Iranian Social Security Organization (ISSO). At the time Electronic Data Systems (EDS) was developing a social security application for ISSO and was also managing ISSO's data center. After the Iranian Revolution in 1978, the agreement with ISSO (and EDS) was terminated. Bank Refah stopped using ISSO data center and reverted to manual processing. All business units and bank branches were instructed to set up paper-based customer and account ledgers.

A few years later in 1988, then CEO of the bank, Mohammad Hossein Kazemi Namin, purchased the first Personal Computer for the bank. He then hired a group of IT professionals and re-established the data processing division. A year later, he made a significant investment and purchased an IBM 4381 Mainframe computer from the United Kingdom. Since then, the bank's IT division has purchased, developed and implemented several small and large computers and software packages. However, despite the efforts, its IT infrastructure and systems are well behind modern western and regional banks. Lack of skilled IT resources, unavailability of high speed data lines, insufficient investment, poor IT leadership and foreign sanctions have contributed to the slow progress of data processing in the Iranian banks and Bank Refah hasn't been an exception.

In the spring of 2007, Bank Refah opened its first unmanned branch in Tehran with two ATM's and four information kiosks. This bank branch is located at Galoobandak in the vicinity of Tehran's Grand Bazaar.

Bank Refah has installed over 500 Automated Teller Machines (ATM) across its branches in Tehran and other cities. The ATM network is connected to the Iranian Shetab network allowing customers to withdraw cash from any ATM in the country.

See also

Banking and Insurance in Iran
Central Bank of Iran
Privatization in Iran
Islamic banking

References

External links
Bank Refah Official website 
Goliath Knowledge on Demand Web site
The Banker
ArchNet
Iranian Oral History Project, Harvard University
Iran's Ministry of Welfare and Social Affairs Web site

Banks of Iran
Banks established in 1960
Iranian brands
Iranian companies established in 1960